Viljandi Parish is a rural municipality of Viljandi County, Estonia. It is located around the town of Viljandi, but does not include it.

Viljandi Parish was established by merging four municipalities: Paistu, Pärsti, Saarepeedi and Viiratsi parishes. This took place after the municipal elections held on 20 October 2013.

Between 1939 and 1950, Viljandi Parish existed with different borders.

Populated places
Viljandi Parish has 4 small boroughs (alevik): Kolga-Jaani, Mustla, Ramsi and Viiratsi and approximately 126 villages, including: 

  Aidu
  Aindu
  Alustre
  Ämmuste
  Anikatsi
  Auksi
  Eesnurga
  Heimtali
  Hendrikumõisa
  Holstre
  Intsu
  Jakobimõisa
  Jämejala
  Järtsaare
  Järveküla
  Jõeküla
  Kaavere
  Kalbuse
  Kannuküla
  Kärstna
  Karula
  Kassi
  Kibeküla
  Kiini
  Kiisa
  Kingu
  Kivilõppe
  Koidu
  Kokaviidika
  Kookla
  Kuressaare
  Kuudeküla
  Laanekuru
  Lalsi
  Lätkalu
  Leemeti
  Leie
  Loime
  Lolu
  Loodi
  Luiga
  Mäeltküla
  Mähma
  Maltsa
  Marjamäe
  Marna
  Matapera
  Meleski
  Metsla
  Mõnnaste
  Moori
  Muksi
  Mustapali
  Mustivere
  Odiste
  Oiu
  Oorgu
  Otiküla
  Pahuvere
  Paistu
  Päri
  Parika
  Pärsti
  Peetrimõisa
  Pikru
  Pinska
  Pirmastu
  Põrga
  Porsa
  Puiatu
  Pulleritsu
  Raassilla
  Raudna
  Rebase
  Rebaste
  Ridaküla
  Rihkama
  Riuma
  Roosilla
  Ruudiküla
  Saareküla
  Saarepeedi
  Savikoti
  Sinialliku
  Soe
  Sooviku
  Suislepa
  Sultsi
  Surva
  Taari
  Tagamõisa
  Taganurga
  Tänassilma
  Tarvastu
  Tinnikuru
  Tobraselja
  Tohvri
  Tömbi
  Tõnissaare
  Tõrreküla
  Turva
  Tusti
  Tõnuküla
  Ülensi
  Unametsa
  Uusna
  Väike-Kõpu
  Välgita
  Valma
  Väluste
  Vanamõisa
  Vanausse
  Vana-Võidu
  Vanavälja
  Vardi
  Vardja
  Vasara
  Veisjärve
  Verilaske
  Viisuküla Vilimeeste
  Villa
  Vissuvere
  Võistre
  Vooru

Religion

Gallery

References

External links

  

 
Municipalities of Estonia
Populated places in Viljandi County
Populated places established in 2013